The 2015 Wichita mayoral election took place on April 7, 2015, to elect the mayor of Wichita, Kansas. The election was held concurrently with various other local elections, and is officially nonpartisan.

Incumbent mayor Carl Brewer, a Democrat, was term-limited and could not seek a third term in office.

A primary election was held on March 3, 2015, to decide the two candidates that moved on to the general election. City council member Jeff Longwell defeated retired business executive Sam Williams to become the next mayor.

Primary election

Candidates
 Robert Culver, metal worker
 Sean Hatfield, attorney
 Dan Heflin, product engineer
 Frances Jackson, retired director
 Jeff Longwell, city council member for District 5
 Tony Rosales, businessman
 Tracy Stewart, banker
 Lavonta Williams, city council member for District 1
 Sam Williams, retired business executive and accountant
 Jennifer Winn, businesswoman and Republican candidate for governor in 2014

Declined
 Bob Knight, former mayor
 Norman Williams, former chief of the Wichita Police Department

Endorsements

Results

General election

Candidates
 Jeff Longwell, city council member for District 5
 Sam Williams, retired business executive and accountant

Polling

Results

References

2015 Kansas elections
2015 United States mayoral elections
2015